The 2012 Texas Senate elections took place as part of the biennial United States elections. Texas voters elected state senators in all 31 State Senate districts. Typically, State senators serve four-year terms in the Texas State Senate; however, all Senate seats come up for election in the cycle after decennial redistricting. Due to this, senators elected in 2008 served only two-year terms, and half of the senators elected in this election served two-year terms, coming up for re-election again in 2014. A statewide map of Texas's state Senate districts can be obtained from the Texas Legislative Council here, and individual district maps can be obtained from the U.S. Census here.

Following the 2010 State Senate elections, the Republicans maintained effective control of the Senate with nineteen members to the Democrats' twelve. As the first election after the 2010 United States Census, all senate districts had to be redrawn to account for population changes over the preceding decade. The map passed by the Republican state government was challenged through various avenues for racial gerrymandering, and ultimately a somewhat less biased map was used.

To claim control of the chamber from Republicans, the Democrats needed to gain four seats.  In the end, no seats changed hands.

Background
The Republican Party had held the State Senate since the 1996 elections. Most observers, as well as the national parties, viewed Texas as a safe red state, as Republican candidates had swept statewide elections since 1998. State Republicans reached a new zenith after the 2010 elections, when backlash to the presidency of Barack Obama kept the State Senate firmly in their control and led to a record number of victories in the State House of Representatives.

Challenges to Republican-drawn Senate map

After retaining the Governor's mansion and State Senate and flipping the Texas House of Representatives in the 2002 elections, the Republicans held the trifecta for the first time in state history and kept it for the rest of the decade (see also: Political party strength in Texas). As such, after the 2010 census, they had sole control over redistricting the state's U.S. House delegation and both state legislative chambers for the 2012 elections. The 10th Senate District, the most-altered in the body, belonged to Wendy Davis (D-Fort Worth), whose seat was drawn to add more Republican voters from greater Tarrant County while placing voters from Democratic areas out of the district. However, the proposed Senate map for 2012 was challenged under Section 5 of the Voting Rights Act and in U.S. District Court for racial gerrymandering. The United States District Court for the Western District of Texas ruled with the plaintiffs and proposed its own example map, undoing the racial gerrymander in Senate District 10, and ordered the legislature to draw a new map based on its own. Ultimately, this election used boundaries made with input from both the Court and Republican legislators.

Summary of results

References

State Senate
Texas Senate
Texas State Senate elections